Jonathan J. Gilbert (born April 28, 1967) is an American former television and film actor known for his role as Willie Oleson on the TV series Little House on the Prairie.

Personal life
Gilbert was born on April 28, 1967. He is the adopted son of actors Barbara Cowen (née Barbara Crane) and Paul Gilbert and the adopted brother of actresses Melissa Gilbert and Sara Gilbert.

In Melissa Gilbert's 2010 autobiography, Prairie Tale, she said Paul killed himself in 1976 due to his suffering from constant pain. Barbara then married Harold Abeles, and together they had Sara Abeles, who changed her name to Sara Gilbert, even though she has no relation to Paul.

In Melissa Gilbert's autobiography, she wrote that when Jonathan was in his early 20s, he moved away from California and she had no relationship with him since then, for reasons supposedly unknown to her.  Her autobiography states that he is a stockbroker living in New York City.

Acting career
Gilbert is best known for his performance as Willie Oleson on the NBC TV series, Little House on the Prairie, from 1974 to 1983. He is also one of only six actors on Little House on the Prairie to appear throughout the entire series, along with Melissa Gilbert, Katherine MacGregor, Richard Bull, Kevin Hagen, and Dabbs Greer. In 1979, Gilbert was in the made-for-television movie The Little House Years also as Willie Oleson. Also in 1979, he was in the made-for-TV-Movie The Miracle Worker as Jimmy.

He was in two out of the three made-for-television movies based on the Little House on the Prairie series of books (Little House: Look Back to Yesterday and Little House: The Last Farewell).

Filmography

Television

References

Sources

External links

1967 births
Living people
American adoptees
American male child actors
American male film actors
American male television actors